Shevergan (also Romanized as Shevergān; also known as Shevergon) is a village in Mahur Rural District, Mahvarmilani District, Mamasani County, Fars Province, Iran. At the 2006 census, its population was 17, in 5 families.

References 

Populated places in Mamasani County